The 2018–2019 Toyota Finance 86 Championship is the sixth running of the Toyota Finance 86 Championship. The championship began on 2 November 2018 at Pukekohe Park Raceway and will conclude on 10 March 2019 at Hampton Downs Motorsport Park.

Teams and drivers 
All teams are New-Zealand registered.

Race calendar and results
All rounds are to be held in New Zealand. The first round in Pukekohe Park Raceway will be held in support of the Supercars Championship. Rounds 3, 4 and 5 are to be held with the Toyota Racing Series.

Championship standings 
In order for a driver to score championship points, they had to complete at least 75% of the race winner's distance, and be running at the finish. All races counted towards the final championship standings. 

Scoring system

Bold – PoleItalics – Fastest Lap

References

External links
 

Toyota Finance 86 Championship
Toyota Finance 86 Championship
Toyota Finance 86 Championship